The 2010 season of the Belgian Football League (BFL) is the regular season played in the Belgium. The first week starts on 14 February 2010 and ends with the 12th week May 2. Then the Playoffs follow in the 13th and 14th week. The 2 remaining teams then compete in the championship Belgian Bowl XXIII. This is played in the 16th week on 29 May 2010

Regular season

Regular Season overview
The FFL schedules two games at one location for saving on transportationcosts for referees and the costs of renting an ambulance and first aid responders. Half of the time, teams are playing virtually at home but actually play at the hosting team's homefield due to these costsaving measures. 
{| bgcolor="#f7f8ff" cellpadding="3" cellspacing="0" border="1" style="font-size: 90%; border: gray solid 1px; border-collapse: collapse;"
|- bgcolor="#CCCCCC"
!  style=background-color:yellow colspan=7 |FFL
|- bgcolor="#CCCCCC" 
!Week!! Date !! Kickoff !! Visitors !! Results !! Home !! Game Site
|-width="23%"
|| 1 || 14-02 ||  colspan="5" align="center"| Bye week due to bad weather: (rescheduled 04-04)
|-width="23%" bgcolor="#FFFFE0"
|rowspan=4| 2 ||rowspan=4| 21-02 || 12.30 || West Flanders Tribes || align=center|  38 – 0 || Leuven Lions ||rowspan=2|  Leopoldsburg
|-width="23%" bgcolor="#FFFFE0"
|| 15.00 || Bornem Titans || align=center| 36 – 12 || Limburg Shotguns
|-width="23%" bgcolor="#FFFFE0"
|| 12.30 || Brussels Black Angels || align=center| 20 – 12 || Antwerp Diamonds ||rowspan=2| Ghent
|-width="23%" bgcolor="#FFFFE0"
|| 15.00 || Brussels Bulls || align=center| 0 – 19 || Ghent Gators|-width="23%"
|rowspan=4| 3 ||rowspan=4|  28-02 || 15.00 || Bornem Titans || align=center| (02-05) || West Flanders Tribes||rowspan=2|  Izegem
|-width="23%"
|| 12.30 || Limburg Shotguns || align=center| (02-05) || Brussels Black Angels
|-width="23%"
||12.30 || Antwerp Diamonds || align=center| 18 – 2 || Brussels Bulls || Korbeek-Lo (LL)
|-width="23%"
|| 15.00 || Ghent Gators || align=center| (02-05) || Leuven Lions || Korbeek-Lo (LL)
|-width="23%" bgcolor="#FFFFE0"
|rowspan=2| 4 ||rowspan=2|  07-03 || 15.00 || Antwerp Diamonds || align=center| 0 – 28 || West Flanders Tribes||rowspan=2|  Ostend
|-width="23%" bgcolor="#FFFFE0"
|| 12.30 || Brussels Black Angels || align=center| 20 – 12 || Ghent Gators
|-width="23%"
|rowspan=3| 5 ||rowspan=3|  14-03 || 14.00 || Bornem Titans || align=center|47 – 0 || Antwerp Diamonds || Berendrecht
|-width="23%"
|| 12.30 || Brussels Bulls || align=center| 35 – 14 || Limburg Shotguns ||rowspan=2|  Brussels (BBA)
|-width="23%"
|| 15.00 || Leuven Lions || align=center| 0 – 23 || Brussels Black Angels|-width="23%" bgcolor="#FFFFE0"
|rowspan=3| 6 ||rowspan=3| 21-03 || 14.00 || Brussels Bulls || align=center| 14 – 26 || West Flanders Tribes|| Izegem
|-width="23%" bgcolor="#FFFFE0"
|| 13.30 || Leuven Lions || align=center| 13 – 0 || Antwerp Diamonds ||rowspan=2|  Ghent
|-width="23%" bgcolor="#FFFFE0"
|| 16.00 || Limburg Shotguns || align=center| 14 – 20 || Ghent Gators|-width="23%"
|rowspan=4| 7 ||rowspan=4| 28-03 || 15.00 || West Flanders Tribes || align=center| 33 – 7 || Brussels Black Angels||rowspan=2|  Brussels (BBA)
|-width="23%"
|| 12.30 || Bornem Titans || align=center| 19 – 6 || Ghent Gators
|-width="23%"
|| 12.30 || Antwerp Diamonds || align=center| 24 – 6 || Limburg Shotguns ||rowspan=2|  Heverlee (LL)
|-width="23%"
|| 15.00 || Brussels Bulls || align=center| 18 – 13 || Leuven Lions
|-width="23%" bgcolor="#FFFFE0"
|rowspan=4| 8 ||rowspan=4| 04-04 || 12.30 || Limburg Shotguns || align=center| 6 – 33 || West Flanders Tribes||rowspan=2|  Bornem
|-width="23%" bgcolor="#FFFFE0"
|| 15.0 || Leuven Lions || align=center| 0 – 34 || Bornem Titans|-width="23%" bgcolor="#FFFFE0"
|| 12.30 || Antwerp Diamonds || align=center| 12 – 48 || Ghent Gators ||rowspan=2|  Brussels (BB)
|-width="23%" bgcolor="#FFFFE0"
|| 15.00 || Brussels Black Angels || align=center| 50 – 0 || Brussels Bulls
|-width="23%"
|rowspan=3| 9 ||rowspan=3| 11-04 || 12.30 || West Flanders Tribes || align=center| 29 – 9 || Ghent Gators ||rowspan=2|  Brussels (BBA)
|-width="23%"
|| 15.00 || Bornem Titans || align=center| 6 – 13 || Brussels Black Angels|-width="23%"
|| 14.00 || Leuven Lions || align=center| 14 – 18 || Limburg Shotguns || Leopoldsburg
|-width="23%" bgcolor="#FFFFE0"
|rowspan=3| 10 ||rowspan=3| 18-04 || 14.00 || Leuven Lions || align=center|6 – 13 || Antwerp Diamonds || Berendrecht
|-width="23%" bgcolor="#FFFFE0"
|| 12.30 || Limburg Shotguns || align=center| 6 – 13 || Ghent Gators ||rowspan=2|  Brussels (BB)
|-width="23%" bgcolor="#FFFFE0"
|| 15.00 || Bornem Titans || align=center| 23 – 8 || Brussels Bulls
|-width="23%"
|rowspan=2| 11 ||rowspan=2| 25-04 || 12.30 || Brussels Bulls || align=center| 18 – 34 || West Flanders Tribes||rowspan=2|  Bornem
|-width="23%"
|| 15.00 || Brussels Black Angels || align=center| 13 – 3 || Bornem Titans
|-width="23%" bgcolor="#FFFFE0"
|rowspan=3| 12 ||rowspan=3| 02-05 || 15.00 || Bornem Titans || align=center| 23 – 42 || West Flanders Tribes||rowspan=2|  Izegem
|-width="23%" bgcolor="#FFFFE0"
|| 12.30 || Limburg Shotguns || align=center| 0 – 33 || Brussels Black Angels|-width="23%" bgcolor="#FFFFE0"
|| 14.00 || Leuven Lions || align=center| 6 – 6' || Ghent Gators || Ghent
|-
|}
 The games in Izegem on week 3 were rescheduled due to a frozen underground of the gamefield.

Regular season standingsW = Wins, L = Losses, T = Ties, PCT = Winning Percentage, PF= Points For, PA = Points Against – clinched seed to the playoffs''

Post season

References

American football in Belgium
BFL
BFL